SM U-28 or U-XXVIII was a  U-boat or submarine for the Austro-Hungarian Navy. U-28, built by the Austrian firm of Cantiere Navale Triestino (CNT) at the Pola Navy Yard, was launched in January 1917 and commissioned in June.

She displaced nearly  when surfaced and over  when submerged. She was armed with two bow torpedo tubes and could carry a load of up to four torpedoes. She was also equipped with a  deck gun and a machine gun.

During her service career, U-28 sank the British Q-ship HMS  and nine other ships, sending a combined tonnage of 44,743 to the bottom. U-28 was surrendered at Venice in 1919, granted to Italy as a war reparation and broken up the following year.

Design and construction 

After these steps alleviated their most urgent needs, the Austro-Hungarian Navy selected the German Type UB II design for its newest submarines in mid 1915. The Germans were reluctant to allocate any of their wartime resources to Austro-Hungarian construction, but were willing to sell plans for up to six of the UB II boats to be constructed under license in Austria-Hungary. The Navy agreed to the proposal and purchased the plans from AG Weser of Bremen.

U-28 displaced  surfaced and  submerged. She was capable of  while surfaced and  while submerged. U-27-class boats were designed for a crew of 23–24.

U-28 was armed with two  bow torpedo tubes and could carry a complement of four torpedoes. She was also equipped with a /26 caliber deck gun and an  machine gun.

After intricate political negotiations to allocate production of the class between Austrian and Hungarian firms, U-28 was ordered from Cantiere Navale Triestino (CNT) on 12 October 1915. She was laid down by early 1916 at the Pola Navy Yard, and launched on 8 January 1917.

Service career 
After her completion, U-28 was commissioned into the Austro-Hungarian Navy on 26 June 1917 under the command of Linienschiffsleutnant Zdenko Hudeček.
Four days after the U-boat's commissioning, Hudeček achieved his first kill at the helm of U-28. The turret hull ship was carrying wheat from Bombay to Naples when torpedoed and sunk by Hudeček. Three days later, the British India passenger ship  met the same fate. Even though escorted by an Italian destroyer and a trawler, Mongara was torpedoed and sunk by U-28 just  from the breakwater at Messina. The 8,205 GRT liner—the largest ship sunk by U-28—was en route from Sydney to London when she went down, but was spared any loss of life in the attack.

The following month, U-28 sank the 3,881 GRT collier Maston  from Cape Spartivento, Calabria, on 13 August, killing two men of the British ship's crew. Three days after Maston went down, U-28 sank HMS Bradford City, a 3,683 GRT British Q ship in the Straits of Messina, with no loss of life. HMS Bradford City, operating under the pseudonym Saros, had been particularly detached to the Straits to hunt U-28 and had ignored orders to proceed to port from officers unaware of her naval status. After the torpedo struck, the ship's "panic party" had taken to the boats in the hope of luring her attacker to the surface, but the arrival of the French naval trawler Hiver drove U-28 away before the gun crews aboard HMS Bradford City could engage the submarine. HMS Bradford City sank within 30 minutes off San Remo. The 3,296 GRT steamer was sailing in ballast from Marseilles for Karachi.

In January 1918, U-28 sank an additional three ships. Bosforo, an Italian steamer of 2,723 GRT headed for Salonika, was sent to the bottom near Cape Spartivento on 12 January. One sailor aboard the one-year-old ship died in the attack, which occurred while the ship was headed to Messina in ballast. On 21 January, West Wales, a collier headed from Barry to Alexandria, was sunk  from Malta, taking her load of coal and two of her crew to the bottom.

On 8 March, U-28 attacked two ships, sinking one of them. The first ship, Mitra, a 5,592 GRT tanker was hit by U-28 but was able to make port in Malta with her cargo of oil. Later in the month, U-28 sank   from Linosa, killing one sailor in the attack. The 1905 British ship was carrying cotton and cottonseed from Alexandria for London when the attack occurred. Three days later, Stolt Nielsen, a 5,684 GRT steamship, was sent to the bottom  from Malta. Carrying a general cargo for the Admiralty when she went down, the British ship turned out to be the final ship to be sunk by U-28.

At the war's end, U-28 was surrendered to Italy at Venice in 1919. Later awarded to Italy as a war reparation, she was scrapped at Venice in 1920. In her 18-month career, U-28 sank ten ships with a combined tonnage of 44,743, and damaged an eleventh.

Summary of raiding history

Notes

References

Bibliography 

 
 
 
 
 
 
 
 

U-27-class submarines (Austria-Hungary)
U-boats commissioned in 1917
1917 ships
World War I submarines of Austria-Hungary
Ships built in Pola